The following are lists of populated places in Turkey by province:

Adana 
Adıyaman
Afyonkarahisar
Ağrı
Aksaray
Amasya
Ankara 
Antalya 
Ardahan
Artvin
Aydın 
Balıkesir 
Bartın
Batman
Bayburt
Bilecik
Bingöl
Bitlis
Bolu
Burdur
Bursa 
Çanakkale
Çankırı
Çorum
Denizli 
Diyarbakır 
Düzce
Edirne
Elazığ
Erzincan
Erzurum 
Eskişehir 
Gaziantep 
Giresun
Gümüşhane
Hakkâri
Hatay 
Iğdır
Isparta
Istanbul 
İzmir 
Kahramanmaraş 
Karabük
Karaman
Kars
Kastamonu
Kayseri 
Kilis
Kırıkkale
Kırklareli
Kırşehir
Kocaeli 
Konya 
Kütahya
Malatya 
Manisa 
Mardin 
Mersin 
Muğla 
Muş
Nevşehir
Niğde
Ordu 
Osmaniye
Rize
Sakarya 
Samsun 
Şanlıurfa 
Siirt
Sinop
Şırnak
Sivas
Tekirdağ 
Tokat
Trabzon 
Tunceli
Uşak
Van 
Yalova
Yozgat
Zonguldak

See also

References